Darryl Morris (born 7 September 1990) is an English radio broadcaster. He currently hosts the weekend late show on national speech radio station Times Radio.

Prior to joining Times Radio, he hosted the Early Breakfast show on sister station talkRADIO and his own show on TV network talkTV.

Morris began on school radio before being signed to present BBC World Service series Generation Next. He had brief stints at Manchester-based radio station Key 103 and digital station The Hits Radio, as well as working for BBC Radio Manchester as a researcher. 

In 2008, Morris appeared in Chicago Town Pizza television adverts.

In 2009, he joined Global Radio to work across the now rebranded Capital Manchester, formerly Galaxy Manchester, and XFM Manchester. He also presented 12-4pm weekdays on 1458 Gold Radio.

On 24 June 2012 he returned to Bauer Radio (Key 103, Rock FM and The Hits Radio).

He hosted Darryl Morris in the Morning, the breakfast show  on The Hits and Bauer City 3 from 2013 until August 2015. He also hosted a Saturday talk show on Liverpool's Radio City Talk.

He became presenter of Bauer Media Group's Evening Show in July 2016, broadcasting on 9 different radio stations including Key 103, Radio City and Metro Radio. He also hosted the Breakfast Show on Rock FM.

In 2019, Morris moved into speech radio and joined talkRADIO to host the overnight show before moving to Early Breakfast.

In 2021, he produced and presented a documentary about manipulative web design, Dark Patterns, for BBC World Service.  

He has had articles in Grazia, The Guardian and HuffPost and a weekly column in the Lancashire Evening Post. He can occationally be seen as a contributor on BBC News, Sky News and Good Morning Britain.

Morris lives in Manchester and is a season-ticket holder for Bolton Wanderers Football Club.

References

British radio presenters
Living people
1990 births